The South Korea national under-17 football team (recognized as Korea Republic by FIFA) represents South Korea in international under-17 football competitions, and also can be managed as under-15 or under-16 team if necessary.

Recent results and fixtures

The following is a list of match results in the last 12 months, as well as any future matches that have been scheduled.

2022

2023

Coaching staff

Current personnel

Players

Current squad 
The following U-17 players were called-up for overseas friendly match against Croatia, Turkey and Denmark on February 2023. 

|-----
! colspan="9" bgcolor="#B0D3FB" align="left" |
|-----

|-----
! colspan="9" bgcolor="#B0D3FB" align="left" |
|-----

|-----
! colspan="9" bgcolor="#B0D3FB" align="left" | 
|-----

Competitive record

FIFA U-17 World Cup

AFC U-17 Asian Cup

Youth Olympic Games

See also 

 Football in South Korea
 Korea Football Association
 South Korea national football team
 South Korea national football B team
 South Korea national under-23 football team
 South Korea national under-20 football team
 South Korea women's national under-17 football team

References

External links 
 Official website, KFA.or.kr 

 
Youth football in South Korea
Korea Republic
Football